The United States men's national under-16 ice hockey team represents the United States at the Youth Olympic Games.

The team won a gold medal in 2016. Several NHL prospects, such as Jack Eichel and Nick Schmaltz, have played on this team.

Youth Olympic Games record
2012 — 4th place
2016 — 
2020 —

References

under-16
Ice hockey
Junior national ice hockey teams